The Aue is a river in northern Germany in the district of Stade in Lower Saxony.

Course 

The Aue rises in the vicinity of  near Ahlerstedt and flows through the towns and villages of:

 Ahrensmoor-West,
 Ahrenswohlde,
 Bokel,
 Klethen,
 Oersdorf,
 Kakerbeck,
 Bargstedt/Klein Hollenbeck,
 Harsefeld,
 Issendorf and
 Bliedersdorf

to Horneburg, where it changes its name and from there on flows as the Lühe for a further  to the River Elbe.

Flood 
In August 2002 a flood, caused by a long period of heavy rain in the catchment area of the river, broke through the dykes at Horneburg and caused considerable damage there. Horneburg responded to the threat of further flooding by building a stronger quay wall within the village and renovating the dykes.

Gallery

References

See also 
List of rivers of Lower Saxony

Rivers of Lower Saxony
Rivers of Germany